Kaela Pflumm (born February 8, 1991 in Port Jefferson, New York) is an American pair skater. She competed with Christopher Pottenger. She previously competed with Brady Chin. Pflumm & Pottenger are the 2006 & 2007 US Junior national pewter medalists. They qualified for the 2006 Junior Grand Prix Final in their first year on the circuit. They are coached by Ron Ludington.

She and Pottenger announced the end of their partnership on March 13, 2008.

Results

Pairs

 J = Junior level

References

External links 
 Official site
 
 

1991 births
American female pair skaters
Living people
People from Port Jefferson, New York
21st-century American women
20th-century American women